Paweł Bugała (born 31 December 1973 in Lublin) is Polish ex professional football midfielder.

External links
 Player profile - 90minut.pl

1973 births
Living people
Polish footballers
KS Lublinianka players
Górnik Łęczna players
Lech Poznań players
Sportspeople from Lublin

Association football forwards
Stal Kraśnik players